Elizabeth Shin (February 16, 1980 – April 14, 2000) was a Massachusetts Institute of Technology (MIT) student who died from burns inflicted by a fire in her dormitory room. Her death led to a lawsuit against MIT and controversy as to whether MIT paid adequate attention to its students' mental and emotional health, and whether its suicide rate was abnormally high. Although her death was first thought to be a suicide, both MIT and her parents stipulated that it may have been an accident in the subsequent amicable settlement between MIT and the Shins.

Raised in West Orange, New Jersey, Shin was the salutatorian of her graduating class at West Orange High School.

Incident 
On April 10, 2000, a student named Andrew Thomas heard a smoke alarm in Elizabeth's dorm room. Although the door was locked, Thomas could smell smoke and could hear crying coming from within the room. When MIT police broke down the door, they saw Shin "engulfed in flames, flailing on the floor in the middle of her room." Sixty-five percent of her body was covered in third-degree burns, and she died several days later.

Lawsuit 
On January 28, 2002, Shin's family filed a $27.65 million wrongful-death lawsuit against the school and several administrators and employees. They accused the school of "breaching its 'promise' to provide an appropriate medical diagnosis and treatment of Shin, as well as reasonable security, emergency services, and level of care". The lawsuit alleged that despite numerous warning signs, such as sending emails to faculty members saying that she was depressed and wanted to kill herself, she received minimal attention. MIT counseling services sometimes relegated duty to her parents, discharged her with minimal treatment, or failed to take action in response to her emails. Shin's parents say that their daughter's death was the 10th of 12 suicides committed by MIT students since 1990 and was foreseeable by the school's administrators and its Mental Health Services employees.

As part of its defense, MIT implied that Shin's mental health problems started before she entered MIT, including a possible suicide attempt when Shin missed becoming valedictorian of her graduating class.

After the incident, MIT announced an upgrade of its student counseling programs, including more staff members and longer hours. MIT and campus police officers were cleared of wrongdoing in June 2005, but the case against MIT administrators and mental health employees continued. The Shins' lawyer David Deluca commented that the counts against MIT might have been limited by the "immunity that the institution enjoys" as an educational institution.

MIT continued to deny wrongdoing.

On April 3, 2006, MIT announced that the lawsuit had been settled for an undisclosed amount. The Shins released a statement, saying, "We appreciate MIT's willingness to spare our family the ordeal of a trial and have come to understand that our daughter's death was likely a tragic accident. This agreement will allow us to move forward in the healing process."

The Shins' lawyer stated that the results of a toxicology test indicated that Elizabeth had overdosed on a nonprescription medication before the fire that could have prevented her from responding appropriately to the blaze. This evidence may have played a part in the Shins' later admission that Elizabeth's death was an accident.

MIT had experienced nine suicides since 1990, provoking controversy as to whether MIT's suicide rate was abnormally high.

According to an unreferenced 2011 article in The Boston Globe, MIT's suicide rate was not higher than other colleges, refuting an earlier The Boston Globe article cited in The New York Times. The picture is muddied by conflicting studies, unequal comparisons, the sparse nature of the event of suicide compared to other activities, conflicts of interest of reporting parties, and changes in the attitude and actions of academic administrations over the decades.

MIT statement 

MIT Chancellor Phillip Clay announced the trial settlement with this message to the community on April 3, 2006:

References

External links 
 MIT sued, denies liability in death of Elizabeth Shin
 Short tribute
 

1980 births
2000 suicides
American people of Korean descent
April 2000 events in the United States
Suicides by self-immolation
Suicides in Massachusetts
Deaths by person in Massachusetts
Deaths from fire in the United States
Massachusetts Institute of Technology people
People from West Orange, New Jersey
West Orange High School (New Jersey) alumni